The 34th Lo Nuestro Awards ceremony was held at the FTX Arena in Miami on February 24, 2022. Presented and televised by American television network Univision y Las Estrellas, the Lo Nuestro Awards recognized  the most popular Spanish-language music of 2021 that was played on Uforia Audio Network during the year in 35 categories. Spanish singer David Bisbal, Mexican-American TV presenter Alejandra Espinoza, Mexican actor Gabriel Soto, and fellow Mexican singer Yuri hosted the ceremony.

Camilo, Christian Nodal, and J Balvin received the most nominations with ten. Bad Bunny received the most awards, with six, including Artist of the Year and Album of the Year for El Último Tour Del Mundo.

Winners and nominees 

The nominees for the 34th Lo Nuestro Awards were announced digitally on January 25, 2022, by Univision. The winners are listed in bold.

General

Pop

Urban

Tropical

References  

2022 music awards
2022 awards in the United States
Lo Nuestro Awards by year
2022 in Latin music